Ayaz Bakhtiyarovich Guliyev (born 27 November 1996) is a Russian football player of Azerbaijani origin who plays as defensive midfielder or central midfielder for Khimki.

Club career

Spartak Moscow
He made his professional debut in the Russian Professional Football League for FC Spartak-2 Moscow on 9 April 2014 in a game against FC Tambov.

Anzhi Makhachkala
On 20 February 2017, it was announced that Guliyev had joined Russian Premier League club Anzhi Makhachkala on loan.
He made his Russian Premier League debut for Anzhi against Spartak Moscow in Otkrytiye Arena on 12 March 2017. Guliyev scored his first goal for Anzhi in the Russian Premier League match against Arsenal Tula in a 3–2 home victory on 22 October 2017. His Anzhi loan was terminated on 7 January 2018.

Rostov
On 10 January 2018, he joined FC Rostov on loan until 31 May 2018. On 6 June 2018, he moved to Rostov on a permanent basis, signing a 4-year contract. Guliyev scored his first goal for Rostov in the Russian Premier League match against Yenisey in a 4–0 home victory on 19 August 2018.

Return to Spartak
On 9 January 2019, Spartak Moscow announced that they bought Guliyev back from Rostov and signed a long-term contract with him. On 11 May 2021, his contract was terminated by mutual consent.

Arsenal Tula
On 21 June 2021, he signed a two-year contract with Arsenal Tula.

Khimki
On 8 July 2022, Guliyev joined Khimki on a two-season deal.

Career statistics

International
He participated in the 2013 FIFA U-17 World Cup with Russia national under-17 football team.

Later he represented Russia national under-19 football team at the 2015 UEFA European Under-19 Championship, where Russia came in second place.

Personal life
Guliyev was born in Moscow, Russia, to a father from Azerbaijan, Bakhtiyar Guliyev, and a Russian mother.

References

External links
 
 Ayaz Guliyev's profile on FC Rostov website.

1996 births
Footballers from Moscow
Russian sportspeople of Azerbaijani descent
People of Talysh descent
Talysh people
Living people
Russian footballers
Russia youth international footballers
Russia under-21 international footballers
Association football midfielders
FC Spartak-2 Moscow players
FC Anzhi Makhachkala players
FC Rostov players
FC Spartak Moscow players
FC Arsenal Tula players
FC Khimki players
Russian Premier League players
Russian First League players
Russian Second League players